Pinnacle is an unincorporated community and census-designated place (CDP) in Flathead County, Montana, United States. It is in the eastern part of the county, along U.S. Route 2 in the valley of the Middle Fork Flathead River. The community is bordered to the east, across the Middle Fork, by Glacier National Park, and to the west by Flathead National Forest.

Pinnacle was first listed as a CDP prior to the 2020 census.

Demographics

References 

Census-designated places in Flathead County, Montana
Census-designated places in Montana